Humeme is a language of the "Bird's Tail" of Papua New Guinea. It is spoken mainly in and around the village of Manugoro in Rigo Central Rural LLG, Central Province.

References

Languages of Papua New Guinea
Humene–Uare languages